The women's doubles Tournament at the 2007 PTT Bangkok Open took place between 8 October and 14 October on the outdoor hard courts in Bangkok, Thailand. Sun Tiantian and Yan Zi won the title after Ayumi Morita and Junri Namigata retired from the final.

Seeds

Draw

References
 Main Draw

Doubles
PTT Bangkok Open - Doubles
 in women's tennis